Stanley Modrzyk (1945-2014) was an American Wiccan High Priest, Ceremonial Magician and spokesman on Wiccan matters.

Modrzyk was the founder of the First Temple of the Craft of W.I.C.A. He was also a founder of the Midwest Pagan Council and of the Pan Pagan Festival.

Ministry 
In the 1970s, Modrzyk started conducting classes, holding media interviews and issuing press releases to counter misinformation about Wicca practices.

In September 1982, Modrzyk received a call from the Chicago Tribune for comment on the five Chicago suburbs that were doing witch burnings as part of their Halloween celebration.  He spearheaded a movement to persuade official in those communities to end the  practice.

In April, 2011 Modrzyk game a lecture entitled Wicca - aka Witchcraft, The Religion and performed a ritual at Eastern Illinois University in Charleston, Illinois.

First Temple of the Craft of W.I.C.A. 
In 1970, Modrzyk founded the First Temple of the Craft of W.I.C.A. in Chicago.  It is one of the five oldest, legally recognized Wiccan churches in the U.S.

First Temple traces its roots to the Temple of The Pagan Way (TPW) by way of the Calumet Pagan Temple. Originally a crossbreed of TPW rituals with ceremonial and qabbalistic influences, it has evolved over the last 40 years to be its own tradition. First Temple honors both the God and the Goddess. It celebrates the New Moon, the Full Moon, and the eight Festivals marked on the Wheel of Life.

Media Appearances

TV 
 3/9/1978 Channel 2 (CBS Chicago) Evening News: Information on Witchcraft
 7/17-18/1978 Channel 2 (CBS Chicago) Mary Laney Special Report: Live at Pan Pagan Festival.
 10/25/1978 Channel 2 (CBS Chicago) Mary Laney Special Report: Witchcraft and Samhain.
 10/1981 Channel 7 (ABC Chicago) 4:30 News Frank Mathie Special Report: Interview on Witchcraft and Samhain.
 10/1981 Channel 50 (Indiana) Bob Freeland's Bottom Line: Show on What IS Witchcraft.
 10/1982 Channel 7 (ABC Chicago) Eyewitness News Alan Krashesky Special Report on Witch Burnings.
 6/10/1994 Channel 32 (Fox Chicago) Fox News Chicago: Modern Day Witches
 10/28/1995 Continental Cablevision (Chicago) Lifestyle With Pat Cheffer: What is Witchcraft and how do Witches celebrate Halloween.
 8/26/1997 SciFi Channel Emmett Miller's Strange Universe: Live at the 21st Pan Pagan Festival
 2/17/1999 Channel 9 (WGN Chicago) WGN TV9 News Special Report: Real Chicago Witches (Tie-in on the news after a Charmed TV show episode.)

Radio 
 3/23/1978 WGN Radio Chicago - The Milt Rosenberg Show: Interview opposite Dusty Sklar on her book Gods & Beasts, Nazis And The Occult.
 5/15/1981 WCGO radio Occult Sciences: Beyond the Realm of Human Comprehension.
 10/1982 Warren Freiberg Show - Interview on the Chicago Witch Burnings.
 1988 WGN Radio Chicago - Ed Swartz show on Satanism with police Chief Donald Story.
 5/1993 WAIF radio in Cincinnati - Night Talk with the Knight Hawk on the Pan Pagan Festival.

Print 
 Raymond Buckland's Complete Guide To Witchcraft (c 1996): Article titled Stan Slays The Dragon.

Bibliography

Books 
 Turning of the Wheel: A Wiccan Book of Shadows for Moons and Festivals (1993) Weiser Books.
 Celebrating Times of Change: A Wiccan Book of Shadows for Family and Coven Growth  (1995). Weiser Books.

References

1945 births
2014 deaths
People from Charleston, Illinois
Wiccan priests
American Wiccans